The Arab College in Jerusalem was secondary school in British Mandatory Palestine. The Arab College lasted from 1918 until 1948, when it was swept away in the 1948 Arab–Israeli War. The British administration began an education system in the former Ottoman lands which consisted of primary schools in the largest towns and a boarding secondary school, the Government Arab College, in Jerusalem. The chief role of the Arab College was to train teachers for the primary schools, which were gradually being added to smaller towns and villages. For a time its principal was the influential Ahmad Samih Khalidi, father of Walid Khalidi and Tarif Khalidi. By the time of its demise, the Arab College had become the most prestigious school for Arab students in Palestine. The buildings were used as UN headquarters for a few years after the war.

Alumni

Ihsan Abbas
Haidar Abdel-Shafi
Abd el-Aziz el-Zoubi
Halil-Salim Jabara
Ismail Khalidi
Salem Hanna Khamis
Abdullah Rimawi
Hasib Sabbagh

References

Defunct schools in the State of Palestine
Mandatory Palestine
History of Palestine (region)
Educational institutions established in 1918
Educational institutions disestablished in 1948
1918 establishments in British-administered Palestine
Organizations based in Mandatory Palestine
1948 disestablishments in the West Bank Governorate
Defunct secondary schools